The following lists events that happened during 1975 in Singapore.

Incumbents
President: Benjamin Henry Sheares
Prime Minister: Lee Kuan Yew

Events

January
1 January – The Singapore Maritime Museum is opened in Sentosa, albeit still under construction.

February
19 February – The first SAFRA clubhouse is opened in Toa Payoh.

April
1 April – The Singapore Air Defence Command is renamed to the Republic of Singapore Air Force.
30 April – The new Royal Sporting House outlet officially opens.

June
2 June –
The Area Licensing Scheme (ALS) was launched in a bid to control traffic into the city, the world's first area licensing scheme.
The Jurong Town Hall is officially opened. It served as the headquarters of the Jurong Town Corporation (now JTC Corporation) until 2000, spearheading Singapore's economy.

July
 30 July – The World Trade Centre will be ready by 1977.

September
 15 September – The Subordinate Courts Building (present day State Courts) starts operations, centralising various courts which were scattered around the city at that time including the Criminal District and Magistrates' Court; the Traffic Courts; and the Civil District Courts.
 24 September – The last British warship, HMS Mermaid, left Sembawang Naval Basin.

November
20 November – Amendments to the Misuse of Drugs Act were passed to introduce the mandatory death penalty for drug trafficking cases.

Date unknown
 The Kranji Reservoir and Pandan Reservoir are completed.
 DBS Building Tower One is completed.
 3S Transport Pte Ltd starts operations as Singapore's second private charter bus company after Woodlands Transport the previous year.

Births
 20 January – Emma Yong, actress, member of Dim Sum Dollies (d. 2012).
 28 January – Tanya Chua, singer.
 19 September – Michelle Chia, actress.
 24 September – Calvin Cheng, former Nominated Member of Parliament.
 6 December – Vincent Ng, martial artist, actor.
 27 December – Daniel Ong, artiste and radio DJ, co-founder of Twelve Cupcakes.
 Tan Wu Meng – politician.
 Kam Ning – violinist.

Deaths
 13 February – Franklin Gimson – Singapore's first postwar Governor and commander-in-chief from 1946 to 1952 (b. 1890).

References

 
Years in Singapore